Beaufort's naked-backed fruit bat (Dobsonia beauforti) is a species of megabat in the family Pteropodidae. It roosts in caves.

Taxonomy and etymology
Beaufort's naked-backed fruit bat was described as a new species in 1975 by W. Bergmans. The holotype was collected in 1909 by Lieven Ferdinand de Beaufort in Waigeo, Indonesia. De Beaufort is the eponym for the species name "beauforti."

Description
Its ears, flight membranes, and back lacks fur. It is sexually dimorphic, with males larger than females. Males are also a bright, yellowish-green in contrast to the drab brown fur of the females. It is similar in appearance to the greenish naked-backed fruit bat, with which it may be confused.

Range and habitat
It is endemic to Indonesia, where its range includes the Raja Ampat, Biak, and Supiori islands in Cenderawasih Bay.

Conservation
As of 2016, it is listed as a least-concern species by the IUCN.

References

Dobsonia
Bats of Indonesia
Endemic fauna of Indonesia
Mammals of Western New Guinea
Least concern biota of Asia
Least concern biota of Oceania
Mammals described in 1975
Taxonomy articles created by Polbot
Bats of New Guinea